The Lesser Eastern Churches is a book by Adrian Fortescue, published in London in 1913. It contains biographical material relating to the following saints:

Mar Abba

References

Sources
 Holweck, F. G., A Biographical Dictionary of the Saints. St. Louis, MO: B. Herder, 1924. 
 The lesser eastern churches (1913)

Christian hagiography
British books